is a Japanese animation studio, founded on March 3, 2008, by former Production I.G and Bones members and based in Suginami, Tokyo. Its business directors are Muneki Ogasawara, Yuichiro Matsuka and Masaki Tachibana. Notable works include Tokyo Magnitude 8.0 in 2009, co-produced with Bones, .hack//Quantum, a 3-episode OVA series, Black Bullet and Barakamon in 2014, Made in Abyss in 2017, and The Rising of the Shield Hero in 2019.

On December 12, 2019, Kinema Citrus announced that Kadokawa and Bushiroad acquired each of them a total of 31.8% on the company. The three companies previously announced a partnership in the same year for the creation of different anime, and one of the reasons for the deal was due to that partnership.

Works

Television series

Films

Original video animations

Original net animation

References

External links

 

 
Animation studios in Tokyo
Japanese animation studios
Japanese companies established in 2008
Mass media companies established in 2008
Suginami
Bushiroad
Kadokawa Corporation subsidiaries
Joint ventures